Patrik Geza Nemeth (born February 8, 1992) is a Swedish professional ice hockey defenceman for the Arizona Coyotes of the National Hockey League (NHL). Nemeth was selected in the second round, 41st overall, by the Dallas Stars in the 2010 NHL Entry Draft. He is of Hungarian descent.

Playing career

AIK
As a youth, Nemeth originally played within the AIK junior system. As a 15-year old, he spent one junior season with Hammarby IF in the J18 Elit in 2007–08 before returning to the ranks of AIK.

In the 2008–09 season, Nemeth showed promise as a defensive defenseman using his developing size through playing at the J18 levels, winning the J18 Allsveskan Championship. He was promoted to play 19 games with the J20 side, and just after his 17th birthday he was elevated to make his professional debut with AIK in the HockeyAllsvenskan, registering an assist against Leksands IF on February 18, 2009.

Nemeth continued his upward development in the 2009–10 season, playing the majority of the campaign with the J20 team, he formed an effective shutdown pairing with Henrik Nilsson, while also providing 20 points through 38 games. While breaking his way into the Allsvenskan, he registered 3 assists in 16 regular games, before making 3 appearances in the Elitserien Qualifiers, helping the club gain promotion to the top tier.

Impressing at each level through his physical style, Nemeth was the first Swedish and European defenseman to be selected at the 2010 NHL Entry Draft, selected in the second round, 41st overall, by the Dallas Stars. While also selected at the 2010 KHL Junior Draft by Metallurg Magnitogorsk, Nemeth continued to play in Sweden.

In the 2010–11 season, Nemeth played his first full professional season in the Elitserien with AIK, recording 1 goal and 7 points in 38 regular season contests with AIK. With AIK successfully progressing to the playoffs, he was scoreless in seven games.

On April 21, 2011, Nemeth was signed to a three-year, entry-level contract with the Dallas Stars. While just 19-years old, Nemeth was to be loaned back to AIK by the Stars for the 2011–12 season to continue his growth. In his second full season in the top tier, he was given greater defensive responsibilities, limited offensively with just 3 assists in 46 games.

Dallas Stars
After attending the Stars' 2012 training camp, Nemeth was assigned to play the 2012–13 season with AHL affiliate, the Texas Stars. He made his debut on opening night, in a 2-1 victory over the San Antonio Rampage on October 12, 2012. In his first full year in North America, Nemeth posted 1 goal and 11 assists with a + 11 through 47 games.

In the following 2013–14 season, Nemeth returned to continue his tenure with Texas in an increased defensive role. After missing a month due to injury, Nemeth returned to compile 3 goals and 10 points and was leading the team in Plus-minus through 37 games, before he received his first recall by the Dallas Stars on March 31, 2014. Replacing an injured Aaron Rome, he made his NHL debut with the Stars, receiving 11:50 of ice time in a 5-0 victory over the Washington Capitals on April 1, 2014. Nemeth skated in 8 regular season games, helping Dallas clinch a playoff berth. In remaining with the Stars, Nemeth made his playoff debut in game 1 of their first-round encounter against the Anaheim Ducks on April 16, 2014. He appeared in five of Dallas’ six postseason games, before losing the series to the Ducks. He was returned to the Texas Stars following Dallas’ elimination and registering five points in 18 games. On June 17, 2014, during the 2014 Calder Cup playoffs, Nemeth scored the game-winning goal in Game 5 of the Calder Cup Finals to lead the Stars past the St. John's IceCaps and help his team win the Calder Cup for the first time in franchise history.

After a strong showing through the previous season and training camp, Nemeth made the Dallas Stars' opening night roster for the 2014–15 season and played in the first five games of the season before he suffered a serious arm laceration in a defensive play against R.J. Umberger on October 18, 2014, against the Philadelphia Flyers. On October 20, 2014, it was announced that he would miss the remainder of the regular season. Nemeth would recover from his injury earlier then scheduled, missing 52 games before returning to play and find his conditioning with the Texas Stars on February 20, 2015. In his recall to the NHL, Nemeth registered his first point, an assist, in a 4-2 victory over the Washington Capitals on March 13, 2015. Nemeth finished with 3 assists in 22 games before returning to the AHL after the conclusion of Dallas' season. He would register 1 assist in 3 post-season games, unable to help Texas defend the Calder Cup. On June 17, 2015, Nemeth as an impending restricted free agent was promptly signed to a two-year contract extension with Dallas.

For a second consecutive season, Nemeth was on the Star roster to start the 2015–16 season. With the club carrying eight defensemen on the blueline, he featured in just 2 games over a month span before he was assigned to the Texas Stars to maintain his conditioning on November 11, 2015. Returning to the NHL after 8 games, Nemeth was used in a third-pairing role for the second half of season, collecting 8 assists in 38 games.

In the 2016–17 season, Nemeth was unable to cement a role with the Stars early in the campaign, resulting as a healthy scratch through 14 of 16 games. He was again reassigned to the Texas Stars for a conditioning stint on January 6, 2017. Returning from the AHL to Dallas, Nemeth again had a strong second half in a shut down third-pairing role, featuring in his 100th NHL game on March 16, 2017, against the Vancouver Canucks. He appeared in 40 games with Dallas, registering 3 assists.

After he was tendered a qualifying offer in the off-season, Nemeth agreed to a one-year $950,000 extension to remain with the Stars on July 1, 2017.

Colorado Avalanche
Entering his seventh season within the Stars organization, and failing to attain a roster position out of training camp, Nemeth was placed on waivers to start the 2017–18 season. On October 3, 2017, Nemeth was claimed off waivers by division rivals, the Colorado Avalanche. Inserted into the lineup on opening night he recorded an assist in his Avalanche debut against the New York Rangers on October 5, 2017. Providing physical and smart plays on the blueline, Nemeth posted his first NHL goal, in his 118th game, during a 5-3 victory over the Carolina Hurricanes on November 2, 2017. Nemeth had recorded 6 points in his first 12 games before suffering a lower-body injury, forcing him to miss 12 games. He returned to the lineup on December 7 and was a mainstay in an improved Colorado defense, featuring in the final 56 contests of the season, the longest of his career. Adding an need stay-at-home presence, Nemeth recorded a career high 3 goals and 15 points in 68 games. He led the Avalanche in Plus-mins (+27), ranking fourth among all NHL defenseman. In helping the Avalanche return to the playoffs for the first time in four years, Nemeth recorded one assist in 6 games, leading the Avalanche in ice time (23:42) in a first-round defeat to the Nashville Predators.

As a restricted free agent, Nemeth originally filed for arbitration on July 6, 2018. Nemeth's break out season was later rewarded, avoiding arbitration by agreeing to a one-year, $2.5 million contract extension with the Avalanche on August 2, 2018.

In the 2018–19 season, Nemeth built upon his first season with the Avalanche, providing a dependable stay-at-home presence to appear in a career high 74 games. He appeared in his 200th NHL game on December 7, 2018, against the Florida Panthers, and finished the regular season with 1 goal and 10 points. In helping the Avalanche qualify for the playoffs for a second consecutive year, Nemeth appeared in all 5 games of the first-round series win over the top-seeded Calgary Flames. With the emergence of highly touted defensive prospect Cale Makar, Nemeth was initially scratched to start their Conference Semifinals series against the San Jose Sharks, while he did eventually play the Avalanche lost the series in 7 games.

Detroit Red Wings
Leaving the Avalanche at the conclusion of his contract as a free agent, Nemeth was signed to a two-year, $6 million contract with the Detroit Red Wings on July 1, 2019.

Return to Colorado
On 9 April 2021, Nemeth was traded with his salary 50% retained by the Red Wings back to the Avalanche in exchange for a fourth-round pick in the 2022 NHL Entry Draft.

New York Rangers
On 28 July 2021, Nemeth signed as a free agent to a three-year, $7.5 million deal with the New York Rangers.

Arizona Coyotes
On July 13, 2022, Nemeth, a second-round pick in the 2025 NHL Entry Draft and a conditional second-round pick in 2026 were traded to the Arizona Coyotes in exchange for Ty Emberson.

International play

Nemeth played for Sweden's junior national team at the 2012 World Junior Championships, where Nemeth recorded an assist on Mika Zibanejad's Winning goal in Overtime in the final against Russia, helping Sweden win its first gold medal since 1981 and their second in history.

Career statistics

Regular season and playoffs

International

Awards and honours

References

External links

 

1992 births
Living people
AIK IF players
Arizona Coyotes players
Colorado Avalanche players
Dallas Stars draft picks
Dallas Stars players
Detroit Red Wings players
Ice hockey people from Stockholm
New York Rangers players
Swedish ice hockey defencemen
Swedish people of Hungarian descent
Texas Stars players